Zsa Zsa is an EP by Sugarsmack, released in 1992 through Three AM Records.

Track listing

Personnel 
Sugarsmack
John Adamian – drums
Chris Chandek – guitar, programming
Deanna Gonzales – percussion
Hope Nicholls – vocals, saxophone, design
Aaron Pitkin – bass guitar, guitar, keyboards, programming
Production and additional personnel
Mel Gray – bass guitar on "He's a Party"
Raymond Grubb – photography
Scott Hull – mastering
Conrad Hunter – engineering
Tom Poston – design
Sugarsmack – production

References 

1992 EPs
Sugarsmack albums